Holcombe House is a large Grade II* listed country house located near Painswick, Gloucestershire. The house is a fine example of an  Arts and Crafts Cotswolds manor house.

History 
Holcombe House was originally built for a wealthy clothier from Painswick in the late 1600s, and was later enlarged and remodelled in the early 1900s by Detmar Blow in the Arts and Crafts manner. The house was subject of a painting by Charles March Gere in 1926.

There are a number of associated listed structures associated with the house including the boundary walls and dovecote which are both Grade II listed.

References

External links

Grade II* listed houses
Arts and Crafts architecture
Houses completed in the 17th century
Painswick
Grade II* listed buildings in Gloucestershire